The Bishop of  was head of an historic Irish diocese, firstly subsumed by the Diocese of Meath and now within the Diocese of Meath and Kildare.

Its hub was the settlement of Fore, County Westmeath.

Bishops

Senior clergy

The only recorded officer of the diocese below that of bishop is Cormac O'Ruadrach.

See also

References

Sources

External links
 Google Books
St. Suairlech of Fore, Bishop  

Religion in County Westmeath
Bishops of Fore